Alex Pedersen may refer to:

 Alexander Pedersen (1891–1955), Norwegian sprinter
 Alex Pedersen (cyclist) (born 1966), Danish cyclist
 Alex Pedersen (politician), American politician on Seattle City Council